Jeffrey Stanley (born September 3, 1967) is a playwright born in Roanoke, Virginia. He began writing in elementary school, and graduated from New York University Tisch School of the Arts Undergraduate Film & TV Program and Graduate Dramatic Writing Program.  He was also a fellow at Yaddo, a Copeland Fellow at Amherst College, an Amtrak Residency for Writers recipient, and a Fulbright-Nehru Scholar.

His first success came with the play Tesla's Letters (1999), a semi-autobiographical wartime drama set in the Balkans just before the Kosovo crisis, produced Off Broadway at the Ensemble Studio Theatre. The cast included Victor Slezak and Judith Roberts. The play has gone on to many other productions and public readings around the world.

That was followed by Medicine, Man (2003), a supernatural dark comedy inspired by his grandmother's death in an Appalachian hospital. The play was commissioned by and premiered at the Mill Mountain Theatre in Stanley's hometown and featured Janelle Schremmer (Chalk), Bev Appleton (The Answer Man) and George C. Hosmer (The Hebrew Hammer).

He also performs autobiographical comic monologues including The Golden Horseshoe: A Lecture On Tragedy, Beautiful Zion: A Book of the Dead and Jeffrey Stanley's Boneyards.

He has written and directed a number of short plays, one of which he adapted into the award-winning short film Lady in a Box, a satire loosely inspired by the Terri Schiavo case, starring Sarita Choudhury and John Lordan (The Company).  He is a past president of the board of directors of the New York Neo-Futurists experimental theatre troupe.

Stanley has written articles for The Washington Post, Time Out New York, The New York Times, the New York Press, The Brooklyn Rail, Hemispheres and Contingent Magazine,  and he was a senior editorial adviser to the nonfiction book on apocalypse movements The End That Does. He has been a guest on Coast to Coast AM.

He teaches film and theatre courses at New York University and Drexel University, and has taught at the Lee Stasberg Theatre and Film Institute.

External links
Jeffrey Stanley's Contingent Magazine review of the hit Indian film RRR The RRRevolution Will Be Cinematic
Jeffrey Stanley's Boneyards

New York Times review of Tesla's Letters; Leaping to the Stage From Tragic Headlines
Roanoke Times review of Medicine, Man
Tesla's Letters script
  Jeffrey Stanley's Washington Post story Four Pairs of Sandals as an Act of Faith
  Jeffrey Stanley's Washington Post story A Jewish-Hindu Connection
 Jeffrey Stanley's Washington Post story Supernatural Skeptics Don't Know What They're Missing
Jeffrey Stanley's New York Times City section cover story Talk Radio
Jeffrey Stanley's Time Out New York article Paul Robeson, The Last Emperor
Jeffrey Stanley's New York Press cover story To Kebab and Conquer
Jeffrey Stanley's New York Press cover story Confessions of a White, Middle-Aged Paan Eater
Jeffrey Stanley's Hemispheres article Full House

1967 births
Living people
20th-century American dramatists and playwrights
Tisch School of the Arts alumni
New York University faculty
Drexel University faculty
Writers from Roanoke, Virginia